"Death Blooms" is a song by American heavy metal band Mudvayne and the second single from their debut album, L.D. 50.

Background and meaning
The song was written by lead singer Chad Gray about his grandmother and how she was being neglected by her family because she was getting old and nobody cared when she had an illness except Chad. She was also taking Chad to local choirs where he learned to sing. Betty Rae, Chad's grandma, died in 2005.

Music video
The video for the song is directed and conceptualized by Thomas Mignone and is shot in two locations: At the abandoned Seaview Hospital located in Staten Island, NY (also utilized in the film Jacob's Ladder), where the four members are playing their instruments; and a seemingly mystic beach in a remote part of Malibu, CA, where an old, frail woman is going through the transition into afterlife, and is aided by a little girl (the younger version of the elder woman) and vocalist Chad Gray to pass into heaven.

Track listing

Charts

References

External links
Music video

2000 songs
Mudvayne songs
Songs about death
Songs written by Chad Gray
Songs written by Ryan Martinie
Songs written by Matthew McDonough
Songs written by Greg Tribbett
Song recordings produced by Garth Richardson